Valentin Yuryevich Novikov (born October 1, 1974) is a Russian orienteering competitor. He is the brother of Leonid Novikov.

World championships
He finished second in the 2004  World Orienteering Championships, Middle distance,  and third in 2007.  He is a two time Relay World Champion, from 2006 and 2007, as a member of the Russian winning teams, and earned a silver medal in 2004.

European championships
Novikov received two individual gold medals at the 2000 European Championships in Truskavets, and a bronze medal at the 2006 European Championships in Otepää. He received also a gold medal in the relay at the 2008 European Orienteering Championships in Ventspils, together with Andrey Khramov and Dmitriy Tsvetkov.

Other international results
In 2004 Valentin became the first non-Scandinavian man who won O-Ringen.

Novikov was part of the winning team in Jukola in 2008. He made a decisive last leg.

References

External links

1974 births
Living people
Russian orienteers
Male orienteers
Foot orienteers
World Orienteering Championships medalists
Junior World Orienteering Championships medalists